Carey John Carrington, Jr.    (1877 – 14 December 1966) was a member of the New Zealand Legislative Council from 17 June 1926 to 16 June 1933; then 17 June 1933 to 16 June 1940, when his term ended. He was appointed by the Reform Government.

He was born in Auckland in the spring of 1877, the eldest son of Carey John Carrington, Sr., who had been born in 1844 in Wokingham, Berkshire, and Alicia Mary Josephine Lonergan.  In 1903, he married Elizabeth McCashin. He died in Tauranga  in 1966 and is buried in Thames Valley.

References 

1877 births
1966 deaths
Members of the New Zealand Legislative Council
Reform Party (New Zealand) MLCs
People from Auckland
Date of birth missing